Niu Junfeng (born 1 December 1992), is a Chinese actor and singer. He learnt Peking opera since young, and later received direct admission to National Academy of Chinese Theatre Arts. Niu debuted as a child actor at the age of ten. He successfully made a transition to an adult actor with his role as a young and rebellious teenager in the television series You Are My Brother. He expanded his acting range with a role as a mentally-challenged youth in the film The Dance of Summer (2013).

Early life and education
Niu was born in Beijing, China. He learnt Peking opera since young, and later received direct admission to National Academy of Chinese Theatre Arts.

Career
Niu debuted as a child actor at the age of ten, in the movie Jia You Jiao Che. Some of his notable roles in his early acting career was in the shemo television series Prelude of Lotus Lantern as young Yang Jian, and a prominent role in the popular sitcom Home with Kids 4.

Niu successfully made a transition to an adult actor with his role as a young and rebellious teenager in the television series You Are My Brother. He further expanded his acting range with a role as a mentally-challenged youth in the film The Dance of Summer .

In 2014, Niu became recognized for his role as "Xiao Man" in the war romance drama Battle of Changsha. The same year, he starred in the family drama He and His Sons  alongside Zhang Guoli. He then starred in the period drama Take The Wrong Car, and received positive reviews for his role as an aspiring musician.

In 2016, Niu successfully broke into the mainstream with supporting role as Yu Banshan in the hit romance comedy drama Love O2O. The following year, Niu played a supporting role in the popular historical romance drama Princess Agents, which led to increased recognition for the actor.

In 2018, Niu played his first leading role in the youth campus drama Your Highness, The Class Monitor. He also played the male lead in the youth film Born to Be Wild.

In 2019, Niu starred in the music romance drama The Brightest Star in the Sky as a talented singer who suffers numerous setbacks.

 The same year, he starred in the espionage drama Fearless Whispers as a patriotic youth, and youth period drama Dear Mayang Street.

On 5 August 2020, it was confirmed that Li Landi will be starring opposite Niu Junfeng in Chess Love.

Filmography

Film

Television series

Variety show

Discography

Awards and nominations

References

1992 births
Living people
Male actors from Beijing
21st-century Chinese male actors
National Academy of Chinese Theatre Arts alumni
Chinese male television actors
Chinese male film actors
Middle School Affiliated to the National Academy of Chinese Theatre Arts alumni